The Océan-class ironclads were a class of three wooden-hulled armored frigates built for the French Navy in the mid to late 1860s.  attempted to blockade Prussian ports in the Baltic Sea in 1870 during the Franco-Prussian War and  participated in the French conquest of Tunisia in 1881.  was often used as the flagship for the Cherbourg Division, the Channel Division, Mediterranean Squadron and the Northern Squadron during her career. The ships were discarded during the 1890s.

Design and description
The Océan-class ironclads were designed by Henri Dupuy de Lôme as an improved version of the s. The ships were central battery ironclads with the armament concentrated amidships. For the first time in a French ironclad three watertight iron bulkheads were fitted in the hull. Like most ironclads of their era they were equipped with a metal-reinforced ram.

Their crew numbered between 750 and 778 officers and men. The ships were over-weight as completed; their draught so exceeded that designed for them that an increase of stability by ballast was impossible. The Océan-class were reported to be able to carry all sail safely, were good sea-boats, steady and well-behaved, but lacking in stiffness (resistance to heeling).

Propulsion
The Océan-class ships had one horizontal-return, connecting-rod, compound steam engine, driving a single propeller using steam provided by eight oval boilers.

Armament
The initial design was to have a main armament of four  guns and four  guns on the main deck in an armoured central battery, and four  guns in open-topped armoured barbettes on the spar deck. In 1869, the armament was changed to four 24 cm guns in barbettes and either six or eight 24 cm guns in the battery, which was then changed to four 24 cm guns in barbettes and four  cm guns in the battery,  The ship's sides were not recessed, so the main deck guns could not fire fore or aft. But the barbettes were slightly sponsoned out over the sides of the hull. If the barbette guns were fired at angles smaller than 45 degrees from the keel-line, the crew had to be withdrawn from the extremities of the ship; for practical purposes, the arc of fire of each barbette was about 100 degrees. The barbettes had steam-powered turntables.

They also had a secondary armament mounted on the broadside on the spar deck of six  guns, the rear pair could be moved to the stern to fire aft.

The guns could fire both solid shot and explosive shells.

By 1885 all of the 138-millimeter guns were replaced by four or six  guns. At some point the ships received a dozen  Hotchkiss 5-barrel revolving guns. They had a rate of fire of about 30 rounds per minute. Late in the ships' careers four above-water  torpedo tubes were added.

Armor
The Ocean-class ships had a complete  waterline belt of wrought iron. The unarmored portions of their sides were protected by  iron plates. Gardiner and Gibbons say that the barbette armor was later removed to improve their stability, but this is not confirmed by any other source.

Ships

Initial cost 
The American, Chief Engineer James Wilson King, gave the cost of each ship as $1,302,000 for the hull and machinery excluding armament, rigging and first outfit of stores, and $260,680 for machinery alone. Thomas Brassey gave the cost of the Marengo as £280,000, and the Suffren as £260,400.

Service
During the Franco-Prussian War of 1870–71 Océan was assigned to the Northern Squadron that attempted to blockade Prussian ports on the Baltic until recalled on 16 September 1870 and ordered to return to Cherbourg. Afterward she was assigned to the Evolutionary Squadron until 1875 when she was placed in reserve. Océan was recommissioned in 1879 for service with the Mediterranean Squadron. She had a lengthy refit in 1884–85 and was assigned to the Northern Squadron after it was completed. Around 1888 the ship was transferred back to the Mediterranean Squadron until she was reduced to reserve around 1891. Océan was assigned to the Gunnery School that same year and later became a training ship for naval apprentices before being condemned in 1894.

Marengo was running her sea trials when the Franco-Prussian War began and was immediately put in reserve. She was recommissioned in 1872 for service with the Mediterranean Squadron until 1876 when she was again placed in reserve. On 2 October 1880 the ship was recommissioned and assigned to the Mediterranean Squadron. Marengo was transferred to the Levant Squadron on 13 February 1881 and bombarded the Tunisian port of Sfax in July 1881 as part of the French conquest of Tunisia. She remained in the Mediterranean until she was assigned to the Reserve Squadron in 1886. In 1888 Marengo became the flagship of the Northern Squadron and led the squadron during its port visit to Kronstadt in 1891. She was reduced to reserve the following year and sold in 1896.

Suffren was placed into reserve after she completed her sea trials and was not commissioned until 1 March 1876 when she became flagship of the Cherbourg Division. Throughout her career the ship was often used as a flagship because of her spacious admiral's quarters. On 1 September 1880 the ship was assigned to the division that participated in the international naval demonstration at Ragusa later that month under the command of Vice Admiral Seymour of the Royal Navy in an attempt to force the Ottoman Empire to comply with the terms of the Treaty of Berlin and turn over the town of Ulcinj to Montenegro. Suffren was reduced to reserve in 1881 and not recommissioned until 23 August 1884 when she was assigned to the Northern Squadron. The ship was transferred to the Mediterranean Squadron about 1888 and remained there until paid off in 1895 and condemned in 1897.

Footnotes

References 

 
 
 
 

 
 
 
 
 
 
 
 
 
 
 
 
 

 
Ironclad warships of the French Navy
Ironclad classes
Ship classes of the French Navy